FK Železničar may refer to:

 FK Železničar Beograd (Belgrade)
 FK Železničar Inđija, Inđija
 FK Železničar Lajkovac
 FK Železničar Niš
 FK Železničar Novi Sad, Novi Sad
 FK Železničar Požarevac, Požarevac
 FK Železničar Smederevo
 FK Železničar Vranjska Banja

See also
FK Željezničar (disambiguation)
NK Železničar (disambiguation)
NK Željezničar (disambiguation)
KK Železničar (disambiguation)